Rune Skarsfjord (born 23 May 1970) is a Norwegian football coach and former player. He worked as head coach for FK Haugesund and as an assistant coach for Rosenborg BK. He was promoted to head coach of SK Brann in 2010 after Steinar Nilsen was dismissed. 

A forward, he played for FK Mjølner, Tromsdalen UIL, Lyn, Moss, Fossum IF, Skjetten SK and Bærum SK; and after being hired as youth coach in Rosenborg BK he also featured for FK Kvik.

References

1970 births
Living people
People from Narvik
Sportspeople from Nordland
Norwegian footballers
Association football forwards
FK Mjølner players
Tromsdalen UIL players
Lyn Fotball players
Moss FK players
Fossum IF players
Skjetten SK players
Bærum SK players
Norwegian football managers
Rosenborg BK non-playing staff
FK Haugesund managers
SK Brann managers
Hønefoss BK managers
Eliteserien managers